Emily Wamusyi Ngii (born 13 August 1986) is a Kenyan racewalker. At the 2019 African Games held in Rabat, Morocco, she won the gold medal in the women's 20 kilometres walk event.

At the 2014 African Championships in Athletics held in Marrakech, Morocco, she won the silver medal in the women's 20 kilometres walk event.

She competed in the women's 20 kilometres walk at the 2022 World Athletics Championships held in Eugene, Oregon, United States.

References

External links 
 

Living people
1986 births
Kenyan female racewalkers
Athletes (track and field) at the 2010 Commonwealth Games
Athletes (track and field) at the 2011 All-Africa Games
Athletes (track and field) at the 2019 African Games
African Games gold medalists for Kenya
African Games medalists in athletics (track and field)
African Games gold medalists in athletics (track and field)
Commonwealth Games competitors for Kenya
20th-century Kenyan women
21st-century Kenyan women
African Championships in Athletics winners
Commonwealth Games medallists in athletics
Commonwealth Games bronze medallists for Kenya
Medallists at the 2022 Commonwealth Games
Athletes (track and field) at the 2022 Commonwealth Games